Mirko Ivanić (born 13 September 1993) is a professional footballer who plays as an attacking midfielder for Red Star Belgrade. Born in Serbia, he represents the Montenegro national team.

Club career

Vojvodina
Born in Bački Jarak, Ivanić came through the youth academy of Vojvodina, before being loaned to Proleter Novi Sad in order to get senior football experience. He made 24 appearances and scored five goals in the 2012–13 Serbian First League. In the summer of 2013, Ivanić returned to Vojvodina, appearing in a 2–0 home win over Budapest Honvéd in the first leg of the Europa League second qualifying round. He was sent on loan again to Proleter Novi Sad, before returning to Vojvodina in the 2014 winter transfer window. Upon his return to the club, Ivanić played regularly under manager Branko Babić, helping his team win the 2013–14 Serbian Cup.

In the 2014–15 season, Ivanić became one of the team's most influential players, making 26 league appearances and scoring 10 goals, one less than Mijat Gaćinović. During the final days of the summer 2015 transfer window, Partizan offered Vojvodina €1.5 million for Ivanić, but Ivanić rejected it, as he insisted on refusing offers from Vojvodina's rivals Partizan and Red Star Belgrade.

BATE Borisov
On 2 February 2016, Ivanić signed a contract with BATE Borisov.

On 26 November 2017, in the last game of the season BATE Borisov were 3-2 down against FC Gorodeya, Mirko scored the last minute equaliser against them to make it 3-3 which was enough to see them win the league on goal difference against league rivals Dinamo Minsk.

During his three-year stint in Borisov, Ivanić won the league three times, as well as featuring in the Europa League group stage two seasons in a row.

Red Star Belgrade
On 8 February 2019, Red Star Belgrade officially announced the signing of Ivanić in a €1.3 million transfer. He chose the number 8 jersey, previously worn by former teammate at Vojvodina, Dejan Meleg, who was sent out on loan to Greek side Levadiakos. Before his transfer to BATE Borisov, Ivanić declined offers from both Red Star and Partizan, stating that "it wouldn't work as the captain of Vojvodina to move to Partizan or Red Star".

International career
Ivanić made his debut for the Serbian national under-21 team in a friendly against Italy U21 on 30 March 2015. He was subsequently selected to represent his country at the 2015 UEFA European Under-21 Championship, but failed to make an appearance. On 14 March 2017, however, Ivanić received a call-up to the Montenegro national team in a 2018 FIFA World Cup qualifier against  Poland on March 26, 2017. In the match against Poland, which Montenegro lost 1-2, Ivanić made his debut coming on the field as a substitute for Damir Kojašević in the 80th minute. On 27 March 2018 he scored his first goal in the national team in a 2–2 draw against Turkey. Despite being called up in June 2019, Ivanić (along with Filip Stojković and Serbian manager Ljubiša Tumbaković) refused to play for the national team against Kosovo. Tumbaković was sacked for his actions the next day.

Career statistics

Club

International goals
Scores and results list Montenegro's goal tally first.

Honours
Vojvodina
 Serbian Cup: 2013–14
BATE Borisov
 Belarusian Premier League (3): 2016, 2017, 2018
 Belarusian Super Cup (2): 2017, 2018
Red Star Belgrade
Serbian SuperLiga (4): 2018–19, 2019–20, 2020–21, 2021–22
Serbian Cup (2): 2020–21, 2021–22

References

External links
 
 

1993 births
Living people
People from Bački Jarak
Serbian people of Montenegrin descent
Association football midfielders
Serbian footballers
Serbia under-21 international footballers
Montenegrin footballers
Montenegro international footballers
FK Proleter Novi Sad players
FK Vojvodina players
FC BATE Borisov players
Red Star Belgrade footballers
Serbian First League players
Serbian SuperLiga players
Belarusian Premier League players
Serbian expatriate footballers
Montenegrin expatriate footballers
Expatriate footballers in Belarus
Montenegrin expatriate sportspeople in Belarus